Backup is the computing function of making copies of data to enable recovery from data loss.

Backup may also refer to:

Information technology
 Backup (backup software), Apple Mac software 
 Backup and Restore, Windows software
 Backup software, the software that performs this function
 List of backup software, specific software packages, loosely categorized
 Backup site, part of a disaster recovery plan

Electrical power facilities
 Battery backup, the use of batteries to continue operation of electrical devices in the absence of utility electric power
 Backup battery, similar to above
 Backup generator, the use of a generator to achieve a similar purpose

Music
 Backup band, a band who plays music in support of a lead musician
 Backing vocalist, one who sings in harmony with a "lead vocalist"
 "Back Up" (Danity Kane song), 2006
 "Back Up" (Pitbull song), 2004
 "Back Up" (Dej Loaf song), feat. Big Sean, 2015
 "Back Up" (Snoop Dogg song), 2015

Motor vehicle
 Backup camera, a camera on the rear of a vehicle, used while moving backwards
 Back-up collision, a type of car accident
 Backing up, driving a vehicle in reverse gear

Others
 Back-up goaltender, an ice hockey team's second-string goaltender
 Backup (TV series), a BBC series about a police Operational Support Unit
 Backup, a 2009 video game by Gregory Weir
 Backup, in sports, a substitute player for a player in the starting lineup

See also